Wilhelm Gustloff (30 January 1895 – 4 February 1936) was the founder of the Swiss NSDAP/AO (the Nazi Party organisation for German citizens living outside Germany) at Davos. He remained its leader from 1932 until he was assassinated in 1936.

Life and assassination

Gustloff (a son of merchant Herrmann Gustloff), who worked for the Swiss government as a meteorologist, joined the NSDAP in 1927. He assisted in the distribution of the antisemitic propaganda book The Protocols of the Elders of Zion, to the point that members of the Swiss Jewish community sued the book's distributor, the Swiss NSDAP/AO, for libel. Gustloff was shot and killed in Davos in 1936 by David Frankfurter, a Yugoslav Jewish student from what is now Croatia, incensed by the growth of the NSDAP.

Frankfurter surrendered immediately to the Swiss police, confessing "I fired the shots because I am a Jew". He was sentenced to 18 years imprisonment and spent the war in a Swiss prison. On May 17, 1945 — shortly after V-E Day — Frankfurter was pardoned by a Swiss court.

Aftermath

Gustloff was given a state funeral in his birthplace of Schwerin in Mecklenburg, with Adolf Hitler, Joseph Goebbels, Hermann Göring, Heinrich Himmler, Martin Bormann and Joachim von Ribbentrop in attendance. Thousands of Hitler Youth members lined the route. His coffin, transported on a special train from Davos to Schwerin, made stops in Stuttgart, Würzburg, Erfurt, Halle, Magdeburg and Wittenberg. Gustloff's widow, mother and brother attended the funeral and received personal condolences from Hitler. Ernst Wilhelm Bohle was the first at Gustloff's funeral to recite a few lines in his honour.

Gustloff was proclaimed a Blutzeuge of the Nazi cause and his murder became part of the propaganda that served as pretext for the 1938 Kristallnacht pogrom.

Unlike the assassination of the German diplomat Ernst vom Rath by Herschel Grynszpan in Paris in 1938, Gustloff's death was not immediately politicized to incite Kristallnacht. Hitler did not want to risk any domestic bouts of antisemitism to cause Germany to lose the recently awarded right to host the 1936 Summer Olympics, since his antisemitic policies had already led to calls to relocate the games.

Namesakes

The German cruise ship MV Wilhelm Gustloff was named for Gustloff by the Nazi regime. The ship was sunk by the Soviet submarine S-13 on 30 January 1945 (coincidentally the 50th anniversary of her namesake's birth) in the Baltic Sea while carrying civilian refugees and military personnel from the advancing Red Army. About 9,400 people died, the greatest death toll from the sinking of a single vessel in human history. The disaster remains relatively unknown.

In 1933 the Nazi Party created the Wilhelm-Gustloff-Stiftung ("The Wilhelm Gustloff Foundation"), a national corporation funded by properties and wealth confiscated from Jews. It ran the Gustloff Werke ("Gustloff Factories"), a group of businesses that had been confiscated from their Jewish owners or partners.

The small arms factory Berlin Suhler Waffen und Fahrzeugwerke was renamed Wilhelm Gustloff Werke in Gustloff's honour in 1939.

See also

Assassination in Davos, a 1975 Swiss feature film concerning the assassination.
Crabwalk – the assassination of Gustloff is an element of the plot of this 2002 novel, even though its main subject is the sinking of the passenger ship named in his memory. 
Herbert Norkus
Horst Wessel
List of Nazis who died in the Beer Hall Putsch

References

Further reading 

 Peter Bollier, 4. Februar 1936: das Attentat auf Wilhelm Gustloff; in: Roland Aergerter (Hrsg.), Politische Attentate des 20. Jahrhunderts, Zürich, NZZ Verlag, 1999
 Matthieu Gillabert, La propagande nazie en Suisse, L'affaire Gustloff 1936, Lausanne, Presses polytechniques et universitaires romandes, 2008
 Emil Ludwig; Peter O. Chotjewitz; Helmut Kreuzer (Hrsg.), Der Mord in Davos, Herbstein, März, 1986
Roger Weston: Fatal Return, 2012. Novel linked to the history and sinking of the Wilhelm Gustloff.

External links

 
The "Reichskristallnacht" Pogrom of the 9/10 November 1938. 
A Survey of Nazi and Pro-Nazi Groups in Switzerland: 1930-1945 
 

1895 births
1936 deaths
Assassinated Nazis
Assassinated German politicians
Deaths by firearm in Switzerland
German conspiracy theorists
German expatriates in Switzerland
German people murdered abroad
Nazi Party members
Protocols of the Elders of Zion
People from Schwerin
People from the Grand Duchy of Mecklenburg-Schwerin
People murdered in Switzerland
Swiss Nazis
1936 murders in Switzerland